Latvia has participated in the biennial classical music competition Eurovision Young Musicians five times since its debut in 1994, most recently taking part in 2002. The country's best result is a second-place finish in 1994.

Participation overview

See also
Latvia in the Eurovision Song Contest
Latvia in the Junior Eurovision Song Contest

References

External links 
 Eurovision Young Musicians

Countries in the Eurovision Young Musicians